{{DISPLAYTITLE:C11H9N}}
The molecular formula C11H9N (molar mass: 155.20 g/mol, exact mass: 155.0735 u) may refer to:

 Benzazocine, or benzoazocine
 2-Phenylpyridine